Live is a live album by contemporary folk three-piece Lau, released on 28 April 2008 by  Navigator Records.

Track listing
All tracks arranged by Kris Drever, Martin Green and Aidan O'Rourke
"Stewarts"
"Banks of Marble"
"Frank and Flo's"
"Butcher Boy"
"Sea"
"The Lang Set"
"Unquiet Grave"
"Hinba"
"Gallowhill"

Personnel
 Kris Drever - guitar, vocals, mixing
 Martin Green - accordion, mixing
 Aidan O'Rourke - fiddle, mixing
 Stuart Hamilton - engineering
 Calum Malcolm - mixing
 Hugo Morris - cover artwork photography

References

Lau (band) albums
2008 live albums
Navigator Records albums